Nazmul Haque Prodhan is a Jatiya Samajtantrik Dal politician and the former Member of Parliament from Panchagarh-1.

Early life
Prodhan was born on 16 January 1957. He has a B.A. and a M.S.S. degree.

Career
Prodhan was elected to Parliament on 5 January 2014 from Panchagarh-1 as a Bangladesh Awami League candidate.

References

Jatiya Samajtantrik Dal politicians
Living people
10th Jatiya Sangsad members
1957 births